Raphidonema is a genus of filamentous green alga comprising five species.  It is a member of the Trebouxiophyceae.

References

Trebouxiophyceae genera
Prasiolales